This list gives an overview of all Members of East German Volkskammer during its 9th election period (1986–1990).   Stand: 15. August 1986

Composition
As per the Volkskammer election of 8 June 1986, according to official results, 99.94% of ballots were for candidates of Die nationale Front.

The election itself had no influence on the composition of the parliament and factions. All seats had been allocated beforehand.

Präsidium
 Chairman of the Volkskammer Horst Sindermann (SED)
 Deputy of the Chairman of the Volkskammer Gerald Götting (CDU)
 Members of Präsidium:  Dr. Rudolf Agtsen (LDPD)  Heinz Eichler (SED)  Günter Hartmann (NDPD)  Werner Heilemann (FDGB)  Wolfgang Heyl (CDU)  Dr. Günther Maleuda (DBD)  Erich Mückenberger (SED)  Manfred Scheler (VdgB)  Wilhelmine Schirmer-Pröscher (DFD)  Dr. Karl-Heinz Schulmeister (Kulturbund)  Volker Voigt (FDJ)

Faction chairmen 
 Faction of the  SED  Erich Mückenberger
 Faction of the DBPD Erwin Binder
 Faction of the CDU  Wolfgang Heyl
 Faction of the LDPD  Dr. Rudolf Agsten
 Faction of the NDPD  Günter Hartmann
 Faction of the FDGB  Hans Jendretzky
 Faction of the DFD  Eva Rohmann
 Faction of the  FDJ  Hans-Joachim Willerding
 Faction of the  Kulturbundes  Dr. Karl-Heinz Schulmeister
 Faction of the VdgB  Manfred Scheler

Members of the parliament

A
 Josef Aberth, DBD
 Dr. Rudolf Agsten, LDPD
 Lutz Ahnfeld, FDJ
 Erika Albrecht, DFD
 Hans Albrecht, SED
 Gudrun Anders, LDPD
 Dr. Erich Arand, VdgB
 Manfred von Ardenne, Kulturbund
 Otto Arndt, SED
 Dr. Karlheinz Arnold, SED
 Helmut Ast, FDGB
 Eberhard Aurich, FDJ
 Bärbel Aust, VdgB
 Hermann Axen, SED

B
 Martina Baumert, SED
 Dr. Gerhard Baumgärtel, CDU
 Manfred Becher, DBD
 Eva Becker, DFD
 Christel Bednareck, FDGB
 Kerstin Bednarsky, DFD
 Friedl Behnke, FDGB
 Dr. Armin Behrendt, LDPD
 Bärbel Behrens, CDU
 Petra Belitz, FDGB
 Dr. Bruno Benthien, LDPD
 Erna Berg, DBD
 Wiete Bergmann, FDGB
 Barbara Beyer, FDJ
 Wolfgang Beyreuther, FDGB
 Ewald Bialas, FDGB
 Jürgen Biering, DBD
 Erwin Binder, DBD
 Bettina Bleil, FDGB
 Karl-Joachim Blume, DBD
 Simone Blumhagen, FDJ
 Frank Bochow, FDGB
 Dr. Heinz Böhm, CDU
 Günter Böhme, SED
 Dr. Hans-Joachim Böhme, SED
 Reinhard Bolduan, SED
 Klaus-Dieter Bormann, FDGB
 Kerstin Braasch, FDJ
 Horst Brasch, SED
 Dr. Manfred Brendel, LDPD
 Heidemarie Brenner, SED
 Ellen Brombacher, SED
 Dr. Christoph Brückner, LDPD
 Horst Brünner, SED
 Günter Brust, LDPD
 Klaus Buchholz, LDPD
 Wolfgang Büchner, FDGB
 Margitta Buhr, SED
 Lothar Burkhardt, SED
 Siegfried Burkhardt, VdgB
 Heinz Busch, LDPD

C
 Johannes Chemnitzer, SED
 Andreas Claus, DBD
 Gerhard Clausner, SED
 Dr. Manfred Clauß, SED
 Arthur Czadeck, FDGB
 Dr. Dietmar Czok, CDU

D
 Fritz Dallmann, VdgB
 Dr. Siegfried Dallmann, NDPD
 Friedrich Dickel, SED
 Jürgen Dietel, FDGB
 Horst Dohlus, SED
 Heike Dombrowski, DBD
 Heinz Dreblow, SED
 Gottfried Drechsel, VdgB
 Heike Drechsler, FDJ
 Dr. Günther Drefahl, Kulturbund

E
 Dr. Paul Eberle, LDPD
 Werner Eberlein, SED
 Günter Ehrensperger, SED
 Herbert Eichhorn, DBD
 Heinz Eichler, SED
 Dr. Klaus Elsner, DBD
 Dr. Gottfried Engelmann, LDPD
 Karin Engert, NDPD
 Albert Enke, FDGB
 Heino Ernst, FDGB
 Manfred Ewald, SED

F
 Ulrich Fahl, CDU
 Dr. Heinz Fahrenkrog, FDGB
 Herbert Fechner, SED
 Dr. Klaus Fehrmann, SED
 Werner Felfe, SED
 Dr. Kurt Fenske, SED
 Lothar Fichtner, SED
 Otto Fiedler, DBD
 Horst Fischer, NDPD
 Dr. Klaus-Christian Fischer, NDPD
 Oskar Fischer, SED
 Sabine Fischer, FDGB
 Manfred Flegel, NDPD
 Peter Florin, SED
 Renate Fölsch, DFD
 Heidi Franke, NDPD
 Heinz Freier, SED
 Lutz Frenkel, FDJ
 Norberta Freundel, NDPD
 Peter Freyer, SED
 Marlies Fritzsch, DBD
 Gisela Fuchs, DFD
 Friedel Fuckel, DFD
 Liesbeth Füßler, DBD
 Otto Funke, SED

G
 Uwe Gajewski, FDJ
 Manfred Gehmert, SED
 Dr. Manfred Gerlach, LDPD
 Joachim-Ernst Gierspeck, LDPD
 Andreas Gleisberg, DBD
 Gerda Göbel, CDU
 Dr. Manfred Goedecke, NDPD
 Beate Göhring, FDGB
 Sybille Göttert, VdgB
 Gerald Götting, CDU
 Otto-Christoph Götze, NDPD
 Andreas Golbs, FDJ
 Ernst Goldenbaum, DBD
 Alfred Grandke, LDPD
 Günther Grewe, CDU
 Jana Grießbach, FDJ
 Hannelore Grimm, FDGB
 Dr. Ines Grosche, CDU
 Irmgard Groschupf, NDPD
 Jurij Groß, SED
 Manfred Grund, LDPD
 Klaus Gysi, Kulturbund

H
 Kerstin Haake, SED
 Susanne Häber, DBD
 Helge Häger, SED
 Hans Härtel, FDJ
 Anita Häußler, SED
 Kurt Hager, SED
 Erika Hahn, LDPD
 Walter Halbritter, SED
 Manfred Hamann, NDPD
 Gero Hammer, NDPD
 Georg Handrick, SED
 Hans-Joachim Hanisch, LDPD
 Brunhilde Hanke, SED
 Martin Hanke, SED
 Siegfried Hanusch, FDGB
 Getrud Hartmann, DBD
 Günter Hartmann, NDPD
 Monika Hasalik, DFD
 Hannelore Hauschild, DFD
 Petra Hecht, DBD
 Werner Heilemann, FDGB
 Horst Heintze, FDGB
 Gerda Heller, LDPD
 Leonhard Helmschrott, DBD
 Dr. Karlheinz Hengst, NDPD
 Katrin Hensel, FDJ
 Johannes Herda, CDU
 Dr. Wolfgang Herger, SED
 Joachim Herrmann, SED
 Hans-Joachim Hertwig, SED
 Edith Herzig, DBD
 Klaus Herzog, FDJ
 Hans-Joachim Heusinger, LDPD
 Kerstin Heyduck, FDJ
 Wolfgang Heyl, CDU
 Lothar Hilbert, VdgB
 Wolfgang Hinz, DBD
 Heino Hinze, Kulturbund
 Annelotte Hochhaus, DFD
 Ruth Höwe, DBD
 Dr. Hans-Joachim Hoffmann, Kulturbund
 Erna Hofmann, FDGB
 Heinz Hofmann, Kulturbund
 Klaus Hofmann, DBD
 Reiner Hofmann, DBD
 Dr. Witho Holland, LDPD
 Gerhard Holtz-Baumert, Kulturbund
 Dr. Heinrich Homann, NDPD
 Erich Honecker, SED
 Margot Honecker, SED
 Dr. Claus Howitz, DBD
 Claus-Jürgen Huch, NDPD
 Max Hübner, FDGB

I
 Helga Isenberg, LDPD

J
 Barbara Jacob, FDGB
 Dr. Brunhild Jaeger, SED
 Dr. Günther Jahn, SED
 Frank Janetzky, FDJ
 Dr. Werner Jarowinsky, SED
 Norbert Jaskulla, NDPD
 Dr. Christa Jauch, LDPD
 Hans Jendretzky, FDGB
 Regina Jeske-Schmidtchen, NDPD
 Hertha Jung, DFD
 Wolfgang Junker, SED

K
 Ingeborg Kachel, FDGB
 Erich Kärger, DBD
 Susanne Kahlert, DFD
 Siegfried Kaiser, FDGB
 Werner Kaiser, NDPD
 Hermann Kalb, CDU
 Dr. Eberhard Kallenbach, NDPD
 Dr. Werner Kalweit, SED
 Hermann Kant, Kulturbund
 Werner Karn, FDGB
 Dr. Werner Karwath, CDU
 Christa Kaufhold, CDU
 Torsten Kaye, FDJ
 Karl Kayser, SED
 Gert Keller, CDU
 Heinz Keßler, SED
 Annelis Kimmel, FDGB
 Dr. Friedrich Kind, CDU
 Hans-Karl Kiok, VdgB
 Werner Kirchhoff, SED
 Helmtraut Klara, DFD
 Günther Kleiber, SED
 Dr. Helmut Klein, SED
 Dr. Volker Klemm, NDPD
 Dr. Gottfried Klepel, CDU
 Eveline Klett, DFD
 Claus-Dieter Knöfler, LDPD
 Dr. Rudolf Kober, NDPD
 Dr. Hans Koch, Kulturbund
 Ursula Köckritz, DFD
 Dr. Lothar Köhler, LDPD
 Ingrid Körner, FDGB
 Werner Körner, LDPD
 Dr. Lothar Kolditz, Kulturbund
 Michael Koplanski, DBD
 Erhard Krack, SED
 Ewald Kramer, CDU
 Fritz Krausch, LDPD
 Gerhard Krause, FDGB
 Hans Krause, DBD
 Marika Krause, NDPD
 Dr. Rosemarie Krautzig, CDU
 Andrea Krebs, VdgB
 Egon Krenz, SED
 Walter Kresse, SED
 Horst Kreter, NDPD
 Waldemar Kreutzberger, NDPD
 René Kriemann, FDJ
 Adolf Kriesche, SED
 Hubertus Kriesel, CDU
 Werner Krolikowski, SED
 Hermann Kühne, DBD
 Heinz Kuhrig, SED
 Doris Kurth, SED
 Ingrid Kurzke, SED
 Günter Kutzschebauch, SED

L
 Helga Labs, FDGB
 Harald Lange, FDGB
 Ingeburg Lange, SED
 Hendry Lehmann, FDGB
 Wolfgang Lesser, Kulturbund
 Hans-Harm Leweke, NDPD
 Hermann Liefländer, LDPD
 Gustav Liepack, SED
 Bruno Lietz, SED
 Karin Limprecht, FDJ
 Gerhard Lindner, LDPD
 Dr. Elke Löbl, FDGB
 Siegfried Löffler, CDU
 Christa Löhn, DFD
 Dr. Johannes Löhn, LDPD
 Rainer Lösekann, LDPD
 Dr. Gottfried Lonitz, LDPD
 Siegfried Lorenz, SED
 Uwe Lorenz, FDJ
 Werner Lorenz, Kulturbund
 Werner Lorenz, CDU

M
 Monika Maak, SED
 Dr. Günther Maleuda, DBD
 Mechthild Marchewka, CDU
 Karl-Heinz Markwart, VdgB
 Dr. Ernst Mecklenburg, DBD
 Dr. Ludwig Mecklinger, SED
 Peter Mederake, NDPD
 Felix Meier, SED
 Dr. Jürgen Meißner, DBD
 Katrin Mende, FDJ
 Werner Mennicke, SED
 Dr. Sieglinde Metten, LDPD
 Erich Mielke, SED
 Gerhard-Peter Mielke, NDPD
 Uwe Milinowski, FDGB
 Dr. Günter Mittag, SED
 Tatjana Mitterer, FDJ
 Hartmut Mitzenheim, CDU
 Dr. Hans Modrow, SED
 Bernhard Mögling, NDPD
 Dr. Hans-Dietrich Möller, NDPD
 Dr. Ute Mohrmann, Kulturbund
 Dr. Peter Moreth, LDPD
 Dr. Helga Mucke-Wittbrodt, DFD
 Helga Mudra, LDPD
 Erich Mückenberger, SED
 Dr. Manfred Mühlmann, NDPD
 Anita Müller, FDGB
 Gerhard Müller, SED
 Günter Müller, FDGB
 Inge Müller, DFD
 Margarete Müller, SED

N
 Dr. Harald Naumann, CDU
 Wolfgang Naumann, NDPD
 Gudrun Nause, DFD
 Gerhard Nennstiel, FDGB
 Heinz Nerlich, NDPD
 Christian Neubert, FDGB
 Alfred Neumann, SED
 Gisela Neumann, DFD
 Karlheinz Niedermeier, FDGB
 Adolf Niggemeier, CDU
 Walter Nörenberg, LDPD

O
 Volker Oertel, NDPD
 Friedrich Otto, NDPD

P
 Engelbert Pade, FDGB
 Marga Paulitschke, DFD
 Elisabeth Pech, DBD
 Thomas Peinke, DBD
 Heike Pemsel, CDU
 Margit Petrat, FDGB
 Gabriele Pfeil, FDGB
 Klaus Pille, LDPD
 Alois Pisnik, SED
 Gundel Plaul, SED
 Elke Plümke, DBD
 Rolf Poche, SED
 Dr. Gerhard Pohl, CDU
 Dr. Eberhard Poppe, Kulturbund
 Dr. Wilfried Poßner, FDJ
 Margot Pschebizin, FDGB

Q
 Gerhard Quade, FDGB
 Bernhard Quandt, SED

R
 Detlef Radke, FDGB
 Klaus Rank, DBD
 Hans-Dieter Raspe, LDPD
 Wolfgang Rauchfuß, SED
 Ursula Raurin-Kutzner, CDU
 Dr. Eberhard Rebling, Kulturbund
 Dr. Hans Reichelt, DBD
 Ute Reiher, FDGB
 Sylvia Retzke, SED
 Ursula Reumann, SED
 Dr. Edith Reumuth, NDPD
 Ilona Richter, SED
 Dr. Konrad Richter, NDPD
 Hans-Joachim Riebow, SED
 Brunhilde Rienecker, DFD
 Renate Ritter, DBD
 Ilse Rodenberg, NDPD
 Annette Römhild, VdgB
 Dr. Fritz Rösel, FDGB
 Doris Röwe, CDU
 Alfred Rohde, SED
 Eva Rohmann, DFD
 Dr. Ulrike Rommel, NDPD
 Karla Rose, CDU
 Horst Rusch, FDGB
 Wilmar Rutt, FDGB

S
 Dr. Anneliese Sälzer, Kulturbund
 Franz-Josef Salbreiter, CDU
 Gertrud Sasse, LDPD
 Günter Schabowski, SED
 Manfred Scheler, VdgB
 Dr. Werner Scheler, Kulturbund
 Dr. Bärbel Schindler-Saefkow, DFD
 Dr. Gregor Schirmer, Kulturbund
 Wilhelmine Schirmer-Pröscher, DFD
 Dr. Volker Schliebe, NDPD
 Ursula Schlosser, DFD
 Verena Schlüsselburg, DBD
 Anneliese Schmidt, DFD
 Bettina Schmidt, FDJ
 Gerhard Schmidt, DBD
 Dr. Burkhard Schneeweiß, CDU
 Dorothea Schneider, CDU
 Ilse Schneider, LDPD
 Dr. Horst Schönfelder, CDU
 Edelgard Schönicke, DBD
 Gerhard Scholz, FDGB
 Paul Scholz, DBD
 Sigrid Schröder, SED
 Ingeborg Schubert, DFD
 Dr. Manfred Schubert, SED
 Gerhard Schürer, SED
 Renate Schüßler, SED
 Gisela Schütt, DFD
 Dr. Karl-Heinz Schulmeister, Kulturbund
 Dr. Joachim Schultz, NDPD
 Gerd Schulz, FDJ
 Marion Schulz, VdgB
 Rudolph Schulze, CDU
 Horst Schumann, SED
 Gustav-Adolf Schur, SED
 Brigitte Schuster, SED
 Dr. Peter Schwartze, Kulturbund
 Ekkehard Schweitzer, NDPD
 Max Sefrin, CDU
 Helmut Semmelmann, SED
 Max Seydewitz, SED
 Günter Sieber, SED
 Rosemarie Sievert, LDPD
 Dr. Käte Sima-Niederkirchner, SED
 Lothar Simon, LDPD
 Horst Sindermann, SED
 Wilhelm Sitte, Kulturbund
 Günther Skrzypek, SED
 Werner Skunde, DBD
 Reinhard Sommer, FDGB
 Ulrich Sommer, LDPD
 Dr. Klaus Sorgenicht, SED
 Dr. Thomas Speck, FDJ
 Roland Spiegel, SED
 Gerhard Springer, LDPD
 Dr. Gerd Staegemann, NDPD
 Dr. Karl-Hermann Steinberg, CDU
 Helmut Steinbrück, SED
 Wilfried Stern, NDPD
 Dr. Albert Stief, SED
 Dieter Stollberg, LDPD
 Willi Stoph, SED
 Frank Straube, FDJ
 Paul Strauß, SED
 Heidemarie Stübner, NDPD
 Dr. Michael Succow, LDPD
 Ellen Süß, FDJ
 Anja Susset, FDJ

T
 Renate Tappert, DFD
 Ilse Thiele, DFD
 Klaus-Dieter Thiemes, DBD
 Lieselotte Thoms-Heinrich, DFD
 Dr. Hans-Manfred Turm, CDU
 Kurt Tiedke, SED
 Ernst Timm, SED
 Harry Tisch, SED
 Dr. Johanna Töpfer, FDGB
 Dr. Heinrich Toeplitz, CDU
 Hannelore Tomaschek, CDU
 Annerose Tomschin, FDJ
 Gottfried Torbicki, NDPD
 Dr. Harry Trumpold, LDPD
 Fritz Tschetschorke, DBD

U
 Kerstin Uhlich, FDGB
 Andreas Uhlig, FDGB
 Uta Ullrich, FDJ
 Dr. Dietrich Unangst, NDPD
 Johannes Unger, FDGB
 Gisela Unrein, FDGB

V
 Paul Verner, SED
 Kerstin Völzer, FDJ
 Karl Vogel, SED
 Volker Voigt, FDJ
 Dr. Dietrich Voigtberger, CDU
 Uta Voigtländer, FDJ

W
 Dr. Rudolf Wabersich, DBD
 Manfred Wahls, CDU
 Werner Walde, SED
 Hans Waldmann, SED
 Christa Waldmann-Hojer, CDU
 Marion Walsmann, CDU
 Rosel Walther, NDPD
 Dr. Horst Wambutt, SED
 Albert Wappler, FDGB
 Dieter Wartewig, NDPD
 Dr. Hans Watzek, DBD
 Simone Wecks, FDJ
 Dr. Wolfgang Weichelt, SED
 Klaus-Peter Weichenhain, LDPD
 Werner Weichenhain, LDPD
 Dietrich Weisel, DBD
 Wilhelm Weißgärber, DBD
 Dr. Herbert Weiz, SED
 Dr. Gert Wendelborn, CDU
 Sabine Wenzel, NDPD
 Rudolf Werion, NDPD
 Dr. Karl-Heinz Werner, DBD
 Monika Werner, SED
 Gerolf Wetzel, DBD
 Ruth Weyh, LDPD
 Christine Wieynk, CDU
 Karin-Christiane Wilhelm, CDU
 Richard Wilhelm (DDR), LDPD
 Dr. Herbert Willem, SED
 Hans-Joachim Willerding, FDJ
 Dr. Hanna Wolf, LDPD
 Dr. Klaus Wolf, CDU
 Dr. Manfred Wolf, FDGB
 Cornelia Wolfram, FDJ
 Lothar Wolter, LDPD
 Dieter-Gerhardt Worm, CDU
 Dr. Werner Wünschmann, CDU

Z
 Tom Zentrich, FDJ
 Gisela Zepp, DFD
 Herbert Ziegenhahn, SED
 Heinz Ziegner, SED
 Brigitte Zienert, DBD
 Ines Zill, VdgB
 Dr. Johannes Zillig, CDU
 Dr. Udo Zylla, NDPD

Volkskammer members
Government of East Germany
List
Volk
Volk
Lists of national legislators
1986 in East Germany
Volkskammer